David Shanks McLay was a Scottish amateur footballer who played in the Scottish League for Queen's Park as a goalkeeper.

Personal life 
McLay served as a corporal in the Gordon Highlanders during the First World War.

Career statistics

References

1898 births
Scottish footballers
Scottish Football League players
British Army personnel of World War I
Association football goalkeepers
Queen's Park F.C. players
Gordon Highlanders soldiers
Place of death missing
Date of death missing
Place of birth missing